Foreign relations between Argentina and Turkey, have existed for over a century. Argentina has an embassy in Ankara and Turkey has an embassy in Buenos Aires. Turkey's staunch support for fellow NATO member United Kingdom during the Falklands War and the recognition of the Armenian genocide by the Argentine parliament have soured relations between the two countries.

History and diplomatic incidents 

The relations between Turkey and Argentina goes back to the signing of the protocol of consular affairs between the Ottoman Empire and Argentina in 1910.

Following the promulgation of the Republic of Turkey, Friendship Agreement was signed in Rome in 1926. 

In 1992, President of Argentina H.E. Carlos Menem visited Turkey and President of Turkey H.E. Süleyman Demirel, visited Argentina in 1995. In 1998, H.E. İsmail Cem was the first Foreign Minister of Turkey who visited Argentina.

Economic links 
Turkey and Argentina have signed an Economic and Commercial Cooperation Agreement. The trade volume between the two countries was approximately US$455 million, with Turkey exporting US$161 million and importing US$294 million from Argentina by the end of 2019. 

Flights from Istanbul to Buenos Aires via São Paulo commenced in December 2013 and are taking place on a daily basis.

In recent years, millions of dollars worth of Turkish TV series have been exported to Argentina.

Nuclear cooperation 
On 3 May 1988, Argentina and Turkey signed a 15-year nuclear cooperation agreement, following Turkey's drive for nuclear fuel cycle independence. Argentina agreed to study the feasibility of building a 300 MWe PWR designed by Empresa Nuclear Argentina de Centrales. Other fuel cycle activities were also explored.

In October 1990, Turkish companies Sezai Turkes-Fevzi Akkaya and TEK formed a joint engineering agreement with Argentine agencies Comision Nacional de Energia Atomica and Investigaciones Applicadas to develop two CAREM-25 nuclear reactors, one in each country, with construction to begin in 1991 in Argentina and in 1992 in Turkey. Former Turkish Prime Minister Turgut Ozal and Argentine President Carlos Menem personally negotiated the deal. However, the arrangement was cancelled a year later due to international pressure because of proliferation concerns.

Visits

See also 
 Foreign relations of Argentina
 Foreign relations of Turkey

References

External links 
 Embassy of Argentina in Turkey
 Embassy of Turkey in Argentina

 
Turkey
Bilateral relations of Turkey